The twenty-ninth series of the British reality television programme The Only Way Is Essex which for reasons unknown was billed as the 30th series began airing on 21 August 2022. Filming for the series commenced in June 2022 and was set to begin months prior, but due to the impact of the COVID-19 pandemic on television, it was postponed. For the first time in the show's history, the series was filmed entirely before the series had begun airing, as opposed to filming days prior to transmission. The series will consist of 11 episodes, with two episodes filmed in the Dominican Republic. Filming ended on 18 August 2022 with an episode filmed in Hythe, Kent, that focused on a party for the cast members. Lime Pictures, the show's production company, recruited extras to appear in the background of the episode.

Elma Pazar, Hannah Voyan, Junaid Ahmed and Mia Sully were cast on The Only Way Is Essex for the series. Jordan Brook also returned during the series, having previously appeared in 2017. Nine of the cast members who had appeared in the Dominican Republic episodes were thrown off their flight back to the UK and met by police officers, since they had refused to wear masks and were vaping on board. An insider for the series said that the involved cast members were set to receive "short shrift from ITV bosses". The series was the first since 2011 not to feature mainstay Chloe Sims, who quit prior to filming began. Her sisters, Demi and Frankie, quit alongside her. Courtney Green and Chloe Meadows where promoted back to full time cast members having been axed after series 27. Liam ‘Gatsby’ Blackwell decided to leave the show after 7 years to move to Los Angeles to be with his Mum and the rest of his family leaving as one of the shows most popular cast members over the years.

Cast

Episodes

References

The Only Way Is Essex
2022 British television seasons